Downtown Music Holdings is a global independent rights management and music services company. Based in New York City, it has been composed of five divisions: Downtown Music Services, Fuga, Songtrust, Adrev and CD Baby. All divisions live under the Downtown Music Holdings umbrella. In addition to its New York headquarters, Downtown has 20 offices across six continents including Los Angeles, London, Paris, Portland, Amsterdam, Johannesburg and Tokyo.

History
Downtown was founded as Downtown Music Publishing in 2007 by Justin Kalifowitz in New York. The business model was developed to address the consolidation of the music publishing industry as well as the new technologies which impacted songwriters and copyright holders. Downtown Music Studios opened in 2008. In 2011, Downtown formally launched Songtrust as a business unit, extending the company's royalty collection platform capabilities beyond the parent publishing company. Neighboring Rights was established in 2016.

Until January 2013, Downtown was the owner of the record label Downtown Records.

In 2013, Downtown expanded its offices to Los Angeles. In early 2014, the company expanded to Nashville and later that year founded Downtown Music Benelux. Based in Amsterdam, Downtown Music Benelux was established in collaboration with Hot Streak Music, a division of Cloud 9 Music. In 2015, following the acquisition of the London-based music publisher Eagle-i Music, Downtown UK was founded.

In March 2019, Downtown acquired AVL Digital Group for $200 million. AVL became the owner of CD Baby, Soundrop, AdRev, and DashGo.

In August 2021, founder Justin Kalifowitz stepped down as CEO and became the company's executive chairman.

Divisions

Downtown Music Services
The publishing division, ranked in Billboard's Music Publishing Top 10, is Downtown's primary focus. In addition to administering copyrights, Downtown Music Publishing's services include royalty collection, songwriter development, catalog marketing, neighbouring rights, and financing services. It arranges co-writing opportunities and places its songwriter's compositions in film, television, advertising, and video game productions.  Downtown writers have written hit songs for artists including Beyoncé, Bruno Mars, Carrie Underwood, Katy Perry, Keith Urban, Rihanna, and Selena Gomez, and, among others, their compositions have been used in the Hunger Games series, Girls, and Grand Theft Auto. Brands that have featured spots from Downtown writers include the NFL, Coca-Cola, Apple Inc, Budweiser and Amazon.

Downtown has formed partnerships with digital service providers including YouTube, Pandora Radio and LyricFind to directly process data and payments owed to songwriters and publishers.  It provides analysis for songwriters, managers, and lawyers, allowing writers to review and export statements, see their account balance, create reports for different periods by income over different territories, and access details of each royalty line.

In 2016, Downtown Music Publishing was nominated for Music Business Worldwide's Publisher of the Year Award.  The company appeared on the Billboard 2014 list of the Top 10 Publishers.

Downtown acquired Salli Isaak Music and Salli Isaak Songs in 2018, giving the publisher the rights to works by One Direction, Madonna, and Sam Smith.

In May 2019, Downtown acquired the 1987 to 2017 catalogue of Belgian music publisher Strictly Confidential.

In May 2020, Downtown acquired two publishers: Good Soldier Songs (home of The 1975), and the South African Sheer Music.

In April 2021, Downtown sold its song publishing roster and catalogue to Concord, though Downtown will continue to represent the publishing rights for several artists including John Lennon and Yoko Ono, Miles Davis, John Prine, and the Wu-Tang Clan.

Songtrust 
Songtrust is a global music rights management software platform. Launched in 2011, it services Downtown Music Service's catalog and provides royalty collection services for creators all over the world. The platform enables creators at all levels to recover their royalties directly from over 90 countries and from more than 20,000 unique income sources worldwide. Songtrust also has business partnerships and provides publishing royalty collection with companies such as sister company CD Baby, Secretly Publishing and Stones Throw Publishing.

CD Baby
CD Baby is an independent music monetization and distribution service based in Portland. They help DIY artists monetize their music through streaming, downloads, vinyl & CD sales, video monetization, sync licensing and publishing royalties (through partnership with sister company, Songtrust). CD Baby also runs DIY distribution service, Soundrop. CD Baby was acquired by Downtown through the acquisition of AVL Digital in 2019.

Adrev
Adrev is a digital content and rights monetization service on Youtube, Facebook and other online video platforms. AdRev is a YouTube partner company that was initially designed to help creators and music rights holders monetize their work with ad placements on other channels using their content. Adrev was founded in 2011 and is based in Los Angeles. Adrev was acquired by Downtown through the acquisition of AVL Digital in 2019.

Fuga
FUGA is a B2B tech and music service company based in The Netherlands. Fuga was acquired by Downtown in January 2020. Fuga provides music distribution and marketing services to labels and management teams around the world.

Downtown Music Studios
Downtown Music Studios was a two studio recording facility located in SoHo, Manhattan. Opened in 2008, the studios were designed by Martin Pilchner and are overseen by chief engineer Zach Hancock. The studio is currently closed, timing of reopening is unknown.

Neighbouring Rights 
Through its direct affiliations with sound recording performance rights services, Downtown formally launched a Neighbouring Rights offering globally in 2016. The division enables Downtown to make certain that artists are compensated when the recorded performance of their songs are performed in public on satellite and online radio services such as Pandora.

Advocacy
Downtown's executives sit on the board of the National Music Publishers Association (NMPA) in the United States, an organization which safeguards and promotes the interests of music publishers and songwriters to government bodies, the music industry, the media, and the public. Additionally, the company recently teamed with the Berklee College of Music's Institute for Creative Entrepreneurship (BerkleeICE) to collaborate on the Open Music Initiative in an effort to achieve fair payment for songwriters through digital licensing.

Kalifowitz is a co-founder of NY is Music, a coalition of over 200 organizations advancing the importance of music in economic development, culture, and education across the state. NY is Music is credited with the passage of the 2015 New York State Tax Credit for Music production.

Partial Downtown Music Publishing roster

Andrew Wyatt
Anthony Newley
The Beatles
Benny Blanco
Booker T. Jones
Budde Music
Carla Bruni
Cold War Kids
Cy Coleman
Edizioni Curci
Fania Records
Hans Zimmer
Hardwell
Imogen Heap
John Lennon
John Prine
Kassner Music
The Kinks
The 1975
Miike Snow
Mötley Crüe
Natalie Merchant
NBKX     
Neon Trees 
Niall Horan
One Direction
Oneohtrix Point Never
Rock Mafia
Ryan Tedder
Santigold
Shaggy
Shea Taylor
Sturgill Simpson
Tori Amos
Trevor Rabin
Tyler Glenn
Wu-Tang Clan
Yoko Ono

Further reading
Justin Kalifowitz Talks Publishing, Big Ideas For 2016
A Letter to the Downtown Community on Direct Licensing

References

External links
Downtown Music Publishing
Songtrust
Downtown Music Studios 

Music publishing companies of the United States
Publishing companies established in 2006
American companies established in 2006